Crescent is a 1964 studio album by jazz musician John Coltrane, released by Impulse! as A-66. Alongside Coltrane on tenor saxophone, the album features McCoy Tyner (piano), Jimmy Garrison (double bass) and Elvin Jones (drums) playing original Coltrane compositions.

Coltrane does not solo at all on side two of the original LP; the ballad "Lonnie's Lament" instead features a long bass solo by Garrison. The album's closing track is an improvisational feature for Jones (with sparse melodic accompaniment from Coltrane's tenor sax and Garrison's bass at the song's beginning and end): Coltrane continued to explore drum/saxophone duets in live performances with this group and on subsequent recordings such as the posthumously released Interstellar Space (with Rashied Ali).

Legacy 
An earlier version of "Lonnie's Lament" appears on Afro-Blue Impressions, and an almost hour-long version of "Crescent" was recorded on Live in Japan. The entire album was collected on The Classic Quartet: The Complete Impulse! Recordings. Coltrane later recorded the song "After the Crescent", which appeared on 1978's To the Beat of a Different Drum.

The title track was later covered by Alice Coltrane for 2004's Translinear Light and McCoy Tyner on his 1991 album Soliloquy. Tyner recorded it again live for the albums McCoy Tyner Plays John Coltrane: Live at the Village Vanguard and Live at Sweet Basil. Guitarist Steve Lukather is the soloist on the version recorded for the 2005 tribute album A Guitar Supreme. The SFJAZZ Collective covered four of the songs on their SFJAZZ Collective 2, with Nicholas Payton and Joshua Redman soloing on the title track.

Garrison's widow recalled that this album along with A Love Supreme were the two he listened to the most.

Track listing 
All songs composed by John Coltrane and published by Jowcol Music (BMI)

Side one
 "Crescent" – 8:41
 "Wise One" – 9:00
 "Bessie's Blues" – 3:22

Side two
"Lonnie's Lament" – 11:45
 "The Drum Thing" – 7:22

Personnel 
John Coltrane Quartet
 John Coltrane – tenor saxophone
 McCoy Tyner – piano
 Jimmy Garrison – double bass
 Elvin Jones – drums

Technical personnel
 Bob Thiele – production
 Rudy Van Gelder – recording and mixing
 Nat Hentoff – liner notes

Compact Disc release
 Michael Cuscuna – production and liner notes
 Eric Labson – digital remastering
 Joe Alper – photography
 Chuck Stewart – photography

Charts

See also
Blue World, an album recorded between Crescent and A Love Supreme released in 2019

References 
Notes

Bibliography

1964 albums
Albums produced by Bob Thiele
Albums recorded at Van Gelder Studio
Hard bop albums
Impulse! Records albums
Instrumental albums
John Coltrane albums
Modal jazz albums